Harry Ho-jen Tseng is a Taiwanese diplomat who has served a deputy Minister of Foreign Affairs of Taiwan since 2020 and its representative to Canada since 2022.

Career
Tseng worked for the Ministry of Foreign Affairs (MOFA) between 1985 and 1989, leaving to pursue advanced degrees in the United States. He graduated from the Woodrow Wilson School of Public and International Affairs in 1991, and continued doctoral studies at the University of Virginia. After completing his studies, Tseng returned to the foreign ministry on the advice of David Lee in 1993. By 2002, Tseng was a section chief at MOFA's Department of North American affairs and an English–Chinese translator for President Chen Shui-bian. He was later appointed department head. Between 2010 and 2014, Tseng was Taiwan's representative to Ireland. He then served as ambassador to Palau. After Tsai Ing-wen became president, Tseng served as deputy secretary-general of the Presidential Office. In August 2016, Tseng assumed the same position at the National Security Council. In 2017, Tseng was named representative to the European Union and Belgium. In June 2020, Tseng was named a deputy foreign minister. Tseng's appointment as Taiwan's representative to Canada was announced in June 2022.

References

Living people
Representatives of Taiwan to Ireland
Ambassadors of the Republic of China
Ambassadors of the Republic of China to Palau
Taiwanese expatriates in the United States
University of Virginia alumni
English–Chinese translators
Taiwanese translators
Government ministers of Taiwan
Representatives of Taiwan to Belgium
Representatives of Taiwan to the European Union
Princeton School of Public and International Affairs alumni
21st-century translators
Year of birth missing (living people)
Representatives of Taiwan to Canada